Verónica Cura is a film producer, production manager, and production designer. She works in the cinema of Argentina.

Cura has worked at Aqua Films with Enrique Piñeyro, a film production company in Argentina. Cura owns since 2008 her own Production Company Utopica Cine partnering with Alex Zito. She teaches Production 101 at the ENERC (Escuela Nacional de Realización y Experimentación Cinematográfica).

Producer filmography
 La Quimera de los héroes (2003) aka The Chimera of Heroes
 Whisky Romeo Zulu (2004)
 Cama adentro (2004) aka Live-In Maid
 Las Mantenidas Sin Sueños (2005)
 Vida en Falcon (2005)
 Fuerza aérea sociedad anónima (2006)
 El Otro (2007) aka The OtherThe Headless Woman (2009)
 Clipeado (2011) aka Clipped'' (in preproduction)

Footnotes

External links
Utopica Cine official site.

Argentine film producers
Argentine women film producers
Living people
Argentine production designers
Year of birth missing (living people)
Place of birth missing (living people)
Women production designers